Stein-Erik Olsen (born 8 September 1953) is a Norwegian classical guitarist and professor of guitar at the University of Bergen, known from collaborations with such as Gro Sandvik, Roar Engelberg and St Martin in the Fields and a series of recordings.

Career
Olsen is a graduate of the Bergen Musikkonservatorium, the Norwegian Academy of Music and Paris Conservatoire National Supérieur de Musique. He has also studied under Per-Olof Johnson and Manuel Barrucco. Since 1992 Olsen has been Professor at the Bergen Musikkonservatorium, from 1995 the Grieg Academy, University of Bergen. He has given concerts all over Europe, with an international debut in Wigmore Hall, London in 1986.

The main focus of his work has always been to explore and record non-traditional music, often composed music developed in collaboration with various composers. In one of his latest releases Olsen reconstructed compositions for two guitars by guitar icon Ida Presti. This recording has received international attention and generated rave reviews, with interviews and stories in such Classical Guitar Magazine. In 2011, Olsen prepares recordings of guitar concerts with the chamber orchestra St Martin in the Fields.

Discography (in selection)

Solo albums
1984: Homage (Simax Classics)		 	
1985: Alveland (Kirkelig Kulturverksted)		 	
1986: Panorama (Kirkelig Kulturverksted)
1986: Blue Sonata (Simax Classics)		 	
1991: Songs & Dances (Simax Classics)
2005: 3-Way Project (Simax Classics)

Collaborative works

With Gro Sandvik
1986: Double Delight (Bergen Digital Studio)
1994: Diptych (Simax Classics)
2010: L'Espace Entre Nous, composed by Noel Zahler

With Roar Engelberg
1989: Mosaic (Kirkelig Kulturverksted)	
1990: Doina (Kirkelig Kulturverksted)
1990: Caffè Europa (Kirkelig Kulturverksted)
2000: Sonata Mongoliana (Simax Classics)

With Olivier Chassain
2009: Les compositions de Ida Presti pour deux guitares (Simax Classics)

References

External links

20th-century Norwegian guitarists
21st-century Norwegian guitarists
Norwegian classical guitarists
Norwegian male guitarists
Musicians from Bergen
Academic staff of the University of Bergen
Simax Classics artists
1953 births
Living people
20th-century guitarists
20th-century Norwegian male musicians
21st-century Norwegian male musicians
Male jazz musicians